"(And You Had a) Do-Wacka-Do" is a song by American country artist Roger Miller, released in 1965. The expression "do-wacka-do" is possibly a funny way of saying "do-like-I-do".
Recorded in October 1964, the song was a lesser hit but it was one of Miller's most enduring lyric inventions.

Background
The song expresses envy in a humorous way. The lyrics are written like a letter to a friend or possibly a former friend ("I hear tell you're doing well, good things have come to you ...") with whom the singer would like to trade places ("I wish I had your good luck charm, and you had a do-wacka-do, wacka-do, wacka-do, wacka-do, wacka-do").

Chart performance

References

1965 singles
1965 songs
Mercury Records singles
Roger Miller songs
Song recordings produced by Jerry Kennedy
Songs written by Roger Miller